Gavros is a village in Meteora municipality, Thessaly, Greece.

Until 2010, Gavros was part of the former municipality of Chasia.

Geography
The village is located between the mountain ranges of Chasia and Antichasia. It is about 25 km northwest of Kalabaka town. Gavros is surrounded by rocks that are an extension of the Meteora rock formation of Kalabaka. The seat of the former municipality of Chasia (Δημοτική Ενότητα Χασίων) was located in Gavros.

Gavros is located at an altitude of 476 meters above sea level.

Monasteries
Historic rock monasteries around Gavros include the Monastery of St. Nicholas (Μονύδριο Αγίου Νικολάου) in a cave at Paliokastro (Παλιόκαστρο) Rock, the Monastery of St. Theodosios (Μονύδριο Αγίου Θεοδοσίου) on the southern banks of the Ion River, and the Monastery of the "Life-Giving" Virgin Mary (Μονύδριο της Παναγίας Ζωοδόχου Πηγής).

See also
Chasia
Antichasia

References

External links
 Chasia: "The Other Meteora" 
 Monastery of Agios Theodosius 

Populated places in Trikala (regional unit)